The Atelchu River is a river of Mato Grosso state in western Brazil.

See also
List of rivers of Mato Grosso

References
Brazilian Ministry of Transport

Rivers of Mato Grosso